Kirnitzschtal is a former municipality in the Sächsische Schweiz-Osterzgebirge district, in Saxony, Germany. Since 1 October 2012, it is part of the town Sebnitz. It had its administrative seat in Lichtenhain.

The municipality was divided into the following 5 Ortsteile:
Altendorf
Mittelndorf
Lichtenhain
Ottendorf
Saupsdorf

Photogallery

See also
Kirnitzschtal Tramway
Lichtenhain Waterfall

References

External links

Sebnitz
Populated places in Saxon Switzerland
Former municipalities in Saxony